Robert L. Barker was a North Carolina State Senator representing Wake, Harnett and Lee Counties.  Barker was born in Harnett County and grew up in Raleigh, attending Millbrook High School.  He attended North Carolina State University.

Barker served as chair of the Senate Committee on Insurance and the Senate Appropriations Subcommittee on Human Resources in the North Carolina General Assembly. He also co-chaired the House–Senate Joint Committee on Medical Malpractice during the malpractice issues of the 1970s. Senator Barker also participated in the planning the state government complex in downtown Raleigh.

Barker played a role in the establishment of a medical school at  East Carolina University and was active in the Boys and Girls Club of Raleigh.  Barker was a real estate appraiser by trade and owned Bob Barker & Associates Inc.

References

North Carolina state senators
2010 deaths
Date of birth missing
Millbrook High School (NC) alumni
North Carolina State University alumni
People from Harnett County, North Carolina